Richie Pitt (born 22 October 1951) is a former professional footballer, born in Ryhope, County Durham, who played in the Football League as a defender for Sunderland, and was part of the club's 1973 FA Cup Final-winning team.

Pitt was an England schoolboy international, played in Sunderland's 1969 FA Youth Cup-winning side, and made his first-team debut in the First Division as a 17-year-old, on 4 March 1969 in a 3–1 defeat away at Coventry City. He was part of the Sunderland team, by then playing in the Second Division, which beat Leeds United, FA Cup-holders and in their ninth season as a top-four side, in the 1973 FA Cup Final. After only a few more games, and only in his early twenties, Pitt sustained an apparently minor knee injury which proved to be a cruciate ligament injury and effectively ending his professional career. He went on to play for non-league club Blyth Spartans, and trained as a teacher working at Thornhill School, later becoming assistant head of Duncan House. In 2013, he was working as a mathematics teacher and head of year at Seaham School of Technology.

References

External links
 

1951 births
Living people
Footballers from County Durham
English footballers
Association football defenders
Sunderland A.F.C. players
Blyth Spartans A.F.C. players
English Football League players
FA Cup Final players